The String Quartet No. 2 by Ernest Bloch was composed in 1945. The quartet averages 34 minutes to perform.

After its premiere, Ernest Newman called the String Quartet No. 2 "the finest work of our time in this genre, one that is worthy to stand beside the last quartets of Beethoven."

Structure 
The quartet is scored for 2 violins, viola and cello and is in four movements:

References 

1945 compositions
Chamber music by Ernest Bloch